Karate Warrior, also known as Fist of Power or The Boy in the Golden Kimono is a 1987 Italian martial arts drama film directed by Fabrizio De Angelis as Larry Ludman.
The film became the first in a series, spawning five sequels.

Synopsis
A young man visiting his father in the Philippines. He inadvertently interferes with the affairs of local gang run by Quino he gets beaten up and left for dead. An old monk nurses Anthony back to health and teaches him the ways of martial arts and even teaches a special technique known as the “Stroke of the Dragon”. Now the young man is determined to defeat Quino and get even for his beating.

Cast 
Kim Rossi Stuart as Anthony Scott 
Ken Watanabe as Master Kimura
Jannelle Barretto as Maria
Jared Martin as Paul Scott 
Janet Agren as Julia Scott
Enrico Torralba as Quino
Jonny Tuazon  
Rudy Meyer  
Rico Orbita   
Arnulfo C. Quiwa

Release
The film was released in Italy on September 3, 1987.

Sequels  
 (1988) 
 (1991) 
 (1992) 
 (1992) 
 (1993)

References

External links
 

1987 films
Italian drama films
1980s Italian-language films
Films directed by Fabrizio De Angelis
1987 martial arts films
1980s teen drama films
Bullying in fiction
1980s action drama films
Films about educators
Films shot in the Philippines
1987 drama films
1980s Italian films